Events from the year 1829 in Russia

Incumbents
 Monarch – Nicholas I

Events

Births

Deaths

 Yekaterina von Engelhardt
 Maria Sinyavskaya

References

1829 in the Russian Empire
Years of the 19th century in the Russian Empire